"17 People" is the eighteenth episode of the second season of American serial political drama The West Wing. The episode aired on April 4, 2001 on NBC. The episode depicts Josiah Bartlet, the President of the United States, informing his aide Toby Ziegler of startling news about the President's condition, as well as other members of the cast trying to rewrite a humorous speech the President is to give. The episode was generally praised for its intensity, as well as its complexity and stark contrast between plotlines.

Plot 
In the previous episode, entitled "The Stackhouse Filibuster", the group learns that Vice President John Hoynes ran an opinion poll on his own favourability after publicly denouncing oil companies, which he had previously been known for being close with. In the beginning of "17 People", Toby is shown to be confused by these actions, spending late nights in his office pondering the question while tossing a pink rubber ball at his office wall. Toby eventually comes to the conclusion that Hoynes thinks that President Bartlet is not going to run for re-election, which is true—Bartlet had made a deal with his wife Abbey, restricting him to one term due to his diagnosis of multiple sclerosis that they had kept from the public. Leo McGarry and the President resolve to inform Toby of Bartlet's illness. When Toby is informed, the conversation devolves into a fight in the Oval Office, where Toby excoriates the President for concealing his illness and making irresponsible decisions because of it.

Toby highlights an example from a previous episode, "He Shall, from Time to Time..."—a few nights before the President was to give his State of the Union address, he had an "attack" that rendered him unconscious while several national security crises were playing out, causing confusion and a lack of clarity in the chain of command. "For ninety minutes that night, there was a coup d'état in this country", concludes Toby. The President responds equally angrily, accusing Toby of arguing in bad faith and only being angry because there were fifteen other people who knew about the President's diagnosis first—his wife, his brother, his three daughters, the six doctors and radiologists who were involved in the initial diagnosis, Leo McGarry, the Vice President, the Chairman of the Joint Chiefs, and the anesthesiologist at George Washington University Hospital who helped operate on the President after he was shot in "In the Shadow of Two Gunmen". Bartlet argues that he had a right to keep his illness private, to which Toby responds that the voters have a right to make an informed decision when electing their leader. Bartlet apologizes to Toby, remarking "I don't know, it may have been unbelievably stupid".

Meanwhile, Sam Seaborn, Josh Lyman, Donna Moss, and Ainsley Hayes, as well as Ed and Larry, attempt to rewrite a draft of the President's speech at the White House Correspondents Dinner when they learn that the lower-level speechwriters, as Josh put it, "forgot to bring the funny". The characters attempt to write better jokes, but stall out as well. In the midst of this, Sam and Ainsley debate the Equal Rights Amendment, or ERA, after he learns that she is going to Smith College to participate in a panel on the amendment. The two address a number of topics, but Ainsley wins the debate when she argues that she does not need a constitutional amendment to declare her equal to a man, saying that "I am mortified to discover there's reason to believe that I wasn't before". After Ainsley makes her exit to find food, Sam comments that he "could've responded", but that he'd "already moved on to other things".

Meanwhile, Josh and Donna argue after he buys her a bouquet of flowers, as Donna interprets the flowers as passive aggressive. Josh explains that it was their "anniversary", as Donna began working for him in April. Donna replies that she began working for him in February, but Josh counters that she left him after beginning work in February to go back to her boyfriend, who had dumped her, and only returned in April after the two broke up again. The two spar until Donna reveals that she had broken up with her boyfriend the second time, and not the other way around, because when Donna had gotten into a car accident, the boyfriend stopped on his way to the hospital to meet some friends for a beer. Josh comments that "if you were in an accident, I wouldn't stop for a beer", to which Donna responds "if you were in an accident, I wouldn't stop for red lights". The episode ends with Toby finally joining the others to work on the speech, but he is brooding and distracted due to what he has learned.

Cast

Reaction 
Reception for the episode was generally positive. Steve Heisler, writing for The A.V. Club, gave the episode a grade of "A−" below the text of his review and a "B" in the sidebar of the article, commenting that the show highlights how The West Wing is "about people who love each other but have issues with one another, and the drama is heightened because it's POTUS." Heisler weighs in on the argument between Bartlet and Toby, commenting that while he is split between the two sides, he agrees more with Toby and argues that being President entails surrendering some privacy to the voters. Heisler then points out the contrast between the Bartlet/Toby storyline and the other subplot. He comments that when the plots intertwine with Toby walking into the Roosevelt room, where the other members of the group are testing jokes on him, while his mind is on the news he has just learned, it "broke my heart". The article ended by criticizing Josh and Donna's storyline in the episode, with Heisler quipping that "I thought Sorkin learned his lesson."

The Ringer included the episode on its list of the 20 best bottle episodes in television history, ranking the episode at seventh. The article complimented the range of the episode, writing that "the episode runs the gamut in terms of tone and stakes." The Ringer called the script's lines from Aaron Sorkin "classic", and ended the article by commenting that the episode "captures the complexities of the bonds between exhausted, impassioned, and stressed-out characters who more or less live at the office."

The Guardian included the episode in its list of the ten best episodes of The West Wing, commenting that episode was "unbearably tense" and noting its focus.

One "superfan" of The West Wing, named Jon White, made a website at "seventeenpeople.com" laying out the plot and intricacies of the episode, and how the various plotlines intertwine. The Guardian, in a separate article, noted the site's quality illustrations and depth of analysis. When asked why White chose to illustrate "17 People", instead of a more popular episode such as "Two Cathedrals", White explained that one could essentially capture the feel of the episode by reading the script, whereas "Two Cathedrals" could only be enjoyed by watching the episode.

References

External links 
 
 Seventeen People

The West Wing (season 2) episodes
2001 American television episodes